Aryn Kyle (born January 22, 1978) is an American novelist and short story writer. She is a 2008 recipient of the Alex Awards.

Life
Kyle was born in Peoria, Illinois and grew up in Grand Junction, Colorado. She graduated from Colorado State University in 2001 and received an MFA in fiction from the University of Montana in 2003.

Kyle’s first short story, “Foaling Season”, was published by The Atlantic Monthly and went on to win a 2004 National Magazine Award in fiction.

“Foaling Season” became the first chapter of Kyle’s debut novel, The God of Animals, which was published by Scribner in March 2007 and became a national bestseller.

The God of Animals is the story of Alice Winston, a young girl coming of age on her family’s rundown horse ranch.  The novel is set in the fictional town of Desert Valley, which Kyle based on Grand Junction, Colorado.  The God of Animals won an Alex Award, a Spur Award for Best Novel of the West and was named by Amazon.com as the Number One Fiction Debut of 2007.

Kyle has had short stories published in The Atlantic Monthly, Ploughshares, The Georgia Review, The Alaska Quarterly Review, StoryQuarterly, and in the anthologies Best New American Voices 2005, and Best American Short Stories 2007.  Her short story collection, Boys and Girls Like You and Me, was released by Scribner in the spring of 2010.

Work

Novels and collections
The God of Animals (2007)
Boys and Girls Like You and Me (2010)

Short stories
"Copper Queen" from The Georgia Review 
"Nine" from The Atlantic Monthly
"Foaling Season" from The Atlantic Monthly
"Femme" from The Georgia Review
"Allegiance" from Ploughshares
"Brides" from Best New American Voices 2005
"The Company of Strangers" from The Alaska Quarterly Review
"Little Deaths" from StoryQuarterly
"Employee/Manager Relations" from Conversely.com

Awards
National Magazine Award, 2004, 2022
Rona Jaffe Foundation Writers' Award, 2005
Pacific Northwest Booksellers Association Award, 2008
Mountains & Plains Independent Booksellers Association Award, 2008
American Library Association Alex Award, 2008
Spur Award for Best Novel of the West, 2008

References

External links
Official Website

1978 births
Living people
21st-century American novelists
American women short story writers
American women novelists
People from Grand Junction, Colorado
Colorado State University alumni
University of Montana alumni
Novelists from Colorado
21st-century American women writers
Rona Jaffe Foundation Writers' Award winners
21st-century American short story writers